Karthika or Kartika  (Tamil : கார்த்திகா , Hindi : कर्थिका, Malayalam : കാർത്തിക) is a popular Indian feminine given name derived from the god Kartikeya, which means "bestower of courage".

Notable people with the given name of Karthika include:

 Karthika (Malayalam actress) - Malayali actress from 1980s and 90s
 Karthika Adaikalam, Tamil actress
 Karthika Mathew, Malayali actress
 Karthika Nair (born 1992), Indian actress and model
 Karthika Thirunal Lakshmi Bayi (1916–2008), Indian queen and linguist
 Kartika Rane, Indian actress
 Kartika Liotard, member of the European Parliament

See also
 Karthik (disambiguation)
 Karthikeyan
 alternative transliteration of Karthik
 Kartikeya, the son of Shiva in the Indian mythology

Hindu given names
Indian feminine given names